Tawas Area School District is a public school district in the U.S. state of Michigan serving pre-kindergarten through twelfth grade, and draws its approximately 1,470 students from the cities of East Tawas and Tawas City as well as Alabaster Township, Baldwin Township, Grant Township, Sherman Township, Tawas Township, and Wilber Township in Iosco County.

The district includes Clara Bolen Elementary (Pre-K to 4), Tawas Area Middle School (5-8), and Tawas Area High School (9-12).

Distinguished alumni
Peter C. Lemon is an alumnus of Tawas Area High School. On January 12, 2005, he donated his Medal of Honor to the school.

Jeff Janis graduated from Tawas Area High School in 2009. A wide receiver for the NFL's Green Bay Packers, he was selected by the Packers in the seventh round of the 2014 NFL Draft.

External links
Tawas Area Schools

School districts in Michigan
Education in Iosco County, Michigan